Colville Lake/Tommy Kochon Aerodrome  is a registered aerodrome located next to Colville Lake, Northwest Territories, Canada. A new terminal, with a small waiting room, washrooms and land line phone, and a longer runway were opened in October 2012 at a cost of CA$12.8 million.

History

Prior to 2012 the airport was located within Colville Lake and had a single  gravel runway (10/28). In 2009 the demand for a longer runway to handle larger aircraft resulted in the relocation.

Airlines and destinations

Facilities

Besides an unmanned terminal there are no other facilities at the airstrip and no fuel is available.

See also
Colville Lake Water Aerodrome

References

External links
 Page about this airport on COPA's Places to Fly airport directory

Airports in the Arctic
Registered aerodromes in the Sahtu Region